Freegard is a surname. Notable people with the surname include:

Bradley Freegard (born 1983), Welsh actor
Siobhan Freegard (born 1967), English entrepreneur and parenting commentator

See also
Robert Hendy-Freegard (born 1971), British conman
Freegard (film), a British film about Robert Hendy-Freegard